Dongwu Boulevard Station is a station on Line 1 of the Wuhan Metro. It was previously the western terminus of Line 1 until December 26, 2017. It entered revenue service on July 29, 2010. It is located in Dongxihu District.

Station layout

Transfers
Bus transfers to Route 746, 528, H81 and HM1 are available at Wuhuan Avenue Station.

References

Wuhan Metro stations
Line 1, Wuhan Metro
Railway stations in China opened in 2010